RAF Durrington was a World War II ground-controlled interception (GCI) radar station in Durrington, West Sussex, a neighbourhood in Worthing in the United Kingdom. RAF Durrington was one of six radar stations built in coastal areas in 1941 to improve the radar capability of the Royal Air Force during night bombing raids by the Axis powers.

Current use
The former GCI radar station is being used as Palatine School, a school for those with special educational needs. The site underwent a major redevelopment in 2006 and was extended from the radar station building to accommodate more pupils.

See also
 List of former Royal Air Force stations

References

External links
http://worthingsussex.blogspot.co.uk/2012/06/raf-durrington.html
http://113squadron.com/id165.htm

Royal Air Force stations in West Sussex
Radar networks